Hans Harting (2 February 1926 – 8 July 2004) was a Dutch middle-distance runner who competed in the 1500 m event at the 1952 Summer Olympics.

References

1926 births
2004 deaths
Athletes (track and field) at the 1952 Summer Olympics
Dutch male middle-distance runners
Olympic athletes of the Netherlands
Sportspeople from Essen
20th-century Dutch people
21st-century Dutch people